Gao Yao may refer to:

Gao Yao (minister), a Chinese mythological figure who served the kings of the Xia dynasty
Gao Yao (footballer) (born 1978), former Chinese footballer
Gaoyao, a city in Guangdong, China
Gaoyao District, an urban district of Zhaoqing in western Guangdong, China